Carmen Zoraida Claudio (December 29, 1947, San Lorenzo, Puerto Rico) is a Puerto Rican educator and university administrator. Claudio is the president of Thomas Alva Edison School. She was the president of National University College where she serves on the board of trustees. She is a graduate in Doctor of Education (EdD), Planning and Evaluation from the Interamerican University of Puerto Rico. Claudio was succeeded by Gloria E. Baquero Lleras. She has worked in education for over 40 years. Claudio was the president of the Asociación de Educación Privada de Puerto Rico.

See also 

 List of women presidents or chancellors of co-ed colleges and universities

References

Living people
1947 births
21st-century Puerto Rican educators
20th-century Puerto Rican educators
Women heads of universities and colleges
Interamerican University of Puerto Rico alumni
People from San Lorenzo, Puerto Rico
National University College
Women school principals and headteachers
Place of birth missing (living people)
20th-century women educators
21st-century American women educators
21st-century American educators
20th-century American women